The continuum of affordable housing in Canada includes market (affordable rental housing and affordable home ownership), non-market (affordable rental housing and affordable home ownership), and government-subsidized housing (emergency shelters, transitional housing and social housing).

As of 2021, 68.55% of Canadian families owned their homes, up from 60% in 1999. About two thirds of households live in homes they own while the other third are in rental housing.  Canada's housing marketplace provided housing for approximately 80% of Canadian households for both homeowners and renters.

Housing affordability is generally measured based on a shelter-cost-to-income ratio (STIR) of 30% by the national housing agency of Canada,  the Canada Mortgage and Housing Corporation (CMHC). Changes to either the cost of housing or income affect affordability. Demographics and social geography inform affordability pressures on different groups of people. A large city in Canada with extremes of wealth and poverty, such as Calgary, Alberta can be the most affordable and least affordable municipality in Canada at the same time, when the question is "Affordable for whom?".

The definitions of 'affordability' and 'affordable housing in Canada' are varied depending on whether the term is used by banks and mortgage providers, real estate agencies in regards to market-based issues, consumers who may or may not be left out to the market, and advocacy organizations supporting the under-housed and unhoused populations.

Starting in the 1980s, federal housing policies changed and more households across Canada began to experience housing affordability pressures, including those who own the residences in which they live and those who rent. In the 1980s, the concept of core housing need was developed by the CMHC as a basis for evaluating those eligible for federal funding under the 1986 Global Agreements on Social Housing, an agreement between the federal, provincial and territorial governments.  A household is considered to be in core housing need if it meets certain criteriaif it falls below acceptable standards of affordability, adequacy, or suitability and if the cost of housing exceeds 30% or more of its before-tax household income.

According to the historian Nathalie Rech in her entry on her 2019 entry "Homelessness in Canada" in the Canadian Encyclopedia, "homelessness" was not referred to as a social problem until the early to mid-1980s. By 2005, as the problem of homelessness increased, Canadian housing policy continued to focus only on "absolute homelessness" as there was no commonly accepted definition of homelessness. This changed in 2012 when the non-profit Canadian Observatory on Homelessness (COH) developed a definition based largely on the European Typology of Homelessness and Housing Exclusion (ETHOS) definition that was widely adopted across Canada. The accepted definition of homelessness in regards to programs and initiatives to respond to homelessness, now includes categories of people who were housed but were "at risk of homelessness" often because of experiencing housing affordability challenges. It also includes people who are "provisionally accommodated"who may be living in over-crowded situations in shared housing with relatives or friends, or those who are in emergency shelters or transitional housing. The fourth category of homelessness includes the unshelteredthose who experience absolute homelessness.

Prior to November 2017, Canada was the only G8 nation that lacked a national housing strategy.  Canada's 2017 National Housing Strategy provided $40 billion of funding over 10 years to build 100,000 new affordable units, repair 300,000 affordable units and to cut homelessness by 50%.

The 2020 report on the 2018 Survey revealed that 1,644,900 Canadian households or 11.6% were in core housing need, compared to 12.7% reported in the 2016 Canadian census. In 2016, the Canadian regions with the most households experiencing core housing need included Nunavut at 36.5%, Northwest Territories at 15.5%, Ontario at 15.3%, and Yukon at 15.2%. The 2016 Census also showed that the highest rates of core housing need in metropolitan areas were Toronto at 19.1% and Vancouver at 17.6%.

By 2022, with an unexpected demand coupled with a diminishing supply of residential real estate along with historically low interest ratesset during the pandemic to stabilize the economythe price of housing rose sky high in Canada. The BBC said that Canada faced some "of the worst housing affordability issues in the world". Based on the Organisation for Economic Co-operation and Development (OECD) data, the "disconnect" between the average home price$817,000and household incomes is "one of the most dramatic". The price represents over "nine times household income". Experts anticipate the high prices and continued strong demand will result in renters dominating the market, particularly in large cities as many people will be priced out of the housing market.

Concerns have been raised that Canada's "rental crisis"a decrease in affordable rental unitshas been exacerbated by the financialization of housing. The number of real estate investment trusts (REITs), hedge funds, private equity firms, and publicly listed real estate firms expanded exponentially over the last three decades in Canada, the United States, the United Kingdom, Australia, and Ireland. REITs are highly recommended as among the most reliable payers of dividends for their investors, particularly for pensioners and others who need safe investments. During the pandemic REITs thrived as they benefit from low mortgage rates and other CMHC grants and loans. While they do improve some apartments through conversions to condos or higher rental units, some housing experts say their business model includes eliminating affordable rental housing.

Overview
The housing continuum includes non-market housinghomelessness, emergency shelters, transitional housing, supportive housing, community and social housingand market housing below-market rental/ownership, private rental, and home ownership.  approximately 80% of Canadian households acquired housing through the market-based housing system.

Based on the Canadian Real Estate Association's (CREA) National Price Map, an average detached house in Canada costs $796,068 in March 2022. According to Statistics Canada, in 2020 the median after-tax income of Canadian families and unattached individuals was $66,800. This represented an increase of 7% from 2019. With a household income of $65,000 an affordable home would cost between $250,000 and $300,000. A home that costs from $450,000 to $500,000 is considered to be affordable for a household with an annual income of $105,000. By 2022, with an unexpected demand coupled with a diminishing supply of residential real estate along with historically low interest ratesset during the pandemic to stabilize the economythe price of housing rose sky high in Canada. The BBC said that Canada faced some "of the worst housing affordability issues in the world". Based on the Organisation for Economic Co-operation and Development (OECD) data, the "disconnect" between the average home price$817,000and household incomes is "one of the most dramatic". The price represents over "nine times household income". Experts anticipate the high prices and continued strong demand will result in renters dominating the market, particularly in large cities as many people will be priced out of the housing market.

About two thirds of Canadian households are home owners, and one third are renters who rent market-rate and non-market units. In 2018, about 13% of renters in Canada lived in housing that was subsidized. According to Statistics Canada and the CMHC's 2018 Canadian Housing Survey (CHS) there were 628,700 households in Canada using government-subsidized social housing intended for households with either low or moderate income. About 129,127 people used an emergency shelter in 2016 in Canada. There were 92 transitional housing facilities across Canada with 7,694 beds in 2019. According to a 2021 Statistics Canada report, in any given year over 235,000 people in Canada experience homelessness; and on any given night the number of people experiencing homelessness ranges from  25,000 to 35,000.

Defining affordable housing in Canada depends on who is measuring and how data is analyzed. Governments, financial institutions (banks, mortgage providers), housing sectors (real estate agencies), consumers, and advocacy organizations use different definitions of affordability.

The provincial and territorial governments provide the most funding for housing and they determine limits on municipal governments. Provinces and territories establish their own regulatory framework for housing and set their own laws which can restrict what municipalities can do. The role of municipalities in housing policy is significant, particularly in setting policies related to zoning, land-use, and in the prevention of homelessness. They are also constrained financially however because they rely mainly on property taxes for funding housing strategies. The federal government provides funding to the provinces, territories, and in some cases directly to municipalities, through bilateral agreements.

The federal role has expanded with the introduction in 2017 of the National Housing Strategy. In 2017 the federal government promised to spend $40 billion over the next decade on housing.

In the 1990s, REITs, hedge funds, private equity firms, and publicly listed real estate firms entered the urban rental market in large North American cities, in the United Kingdom, and Australia; for the next 15 years they expanded exponentially. REITs emerged in Canada when the Canadian Income Tax Act in 1995 allowed REITs to qualify as closed-end trusts. The first REIF was established in Canada in 1997 in Toronto. In the fifteen years between 2000 and 2015, the ownership of Toronto apartments was increasingly concentrated among REITs, institutional investors, private equity funds and some large family-owned firms. In a 2020 Housing Studies article, the author investigated the financialization of rental housing in the private real estate market. She noted the paucity of literature on the provision of social or affordable housing provision, despite the significance of the expansion of the private rental sector on affordable housing. She focused on the private rental sector in "anglophone liberal welfare states" including Canada, the United States, the United Kingdom, Ireland, and Australia. These countries shared similar "comparable 'model[s] of owner-occupation characterized by liberal-economic ideologies and market mechanisms". They all experienced significant growth in the private rental market since the financial crisis.

Ryerson City Building Institute's research and policy manager Graham Haines in Toronto said in 2017 that Canadian policymakers had focused almost exclusively on promoting home ownership since the late 1990s creating a pattern of building housing units, like condos, for investors not for the end usersthe renters. By "letting the market do what the market wants", we neglected the needs of our population. This resulted in a decades-long decline in the supply of purpose-built rental apartments as developers preferred to build condominiums especially with favourable tax policies and incentives in place. Haines said that as millennials reach an age where they are ready to become homebuyers they may well be competing for the same condominiums as seniors who want to downsize. Haines called for public policy changes that favour the construction of appropriate rental units that are affordable for those who will be using them, recognizing that rent will be a significant part of the real estate sector in Canada.

At the 2018 National Housing Conference hosted by the CMHC, concerns were raised about a stark increase in the financialization of the housing sector that had extended into the private rental market. Canadian Federation of Apartment Associations disagreed with the premise, and described conference featured speakers as "progressives". Issues included the rise of "amateur landlords", condominiums, Airbnb, short-term rentals, increased rents, and problems with evictions. Multiple-residential buildings are being purchased as housing assets to generate wealth at a time when rental units are in short supply.

By May 2021, the price of housing increased with a "rapid acceleration", the supply of housing and mortgage rates were at historic lows and the demand increased, with economists at the Royal Bank of Canada and the Canadian Imperial Bank of Commerce raising concerns that speculators were entering the market, pricing young and lower income families out of affordable housing.

With 424 housing units per 1,000 people, Canada ranks lowest of the G7 nations in "average housing supply per capita" compared to France, which has 540 units per 1,000the largest housing supply per capita. Within Canada, the available housing supply inventory is the lowest on record. It reflects a chronic insufficiency of home supply. From 2016 to 2021, the population of Canada increased to about 37 million with the arrival of 1.8 million new residents who often prefer to live in the "downtowns and distant suburbs of large cities". The pandemic exacerbated housing pressures including the unpredicted preference for housing type and geographic location.

A 2022 report by the University of Toronto's Institute on Municipal Finance and Governance calls for more co-operation between levels of government to respond to the affordability crisis in housing. The National Housing Strategy (NHS) was introduced in the National Housing Strategy Act in April 2019 as part of the 2019 Budget Implementation Act. NHS is based on a human rights-based approach to housing and it says that "housing rights are human rights".

In spite of lay-offs caused by the global COVID-19 pandemic, as of February 2022, the Canadian housing market was experiencing an unexpected boom with record-breaking high prices, combined with historically low interest rates and a decreasing supply of real estate. In both 2020 and 2021 real estate sales records were broken. By the end of 2021, the MLS Home Price Index was a record  25.3% higher than 2020. During the pandemic, inter-provincial migration was also strong and continued into 2022, which also contributed to high prices.

In the 7 April 2022 federal budget, "A Plan to Grow Our Economy and Make Life More Affordable", federal government responded to concerns about the role of the speculative market in sky-high real estate prices. A two-year ban on "foreign buyers" was introduced.

The budget also called for a review of tax treatment for large corporate trusts that use residential real estate as financial investment instruments. This review will examine the impact of housing as an asset class on Canadian homebuyers and renters.

The budget also included $1.5B for housing co-ops as part of the solution to the affordable housing crisis. From the early 1990s to 2020, 25 of the biggest financial landlordsincluding REITsconsolidated about 330,000 rental suites representing 20% of Canada's "private, purpose-built stock of rental apartments". REITs had no rental units in 1996; by 2020, they owned 200,000 suites. As of 2021, REITs and other financial landlords benefit from preferential tax treatment which August described as state subsidies. August has called on the CMHC to stop providing financial landlords with "preferential mortgage lending rates", which are effectively subsidies to firms that are not providing public good. 
She also calls on the federal government to disallow financial landlords form accessing National Housing Strategy loans and grants since these firms "eliminate affordable housing as a business strategy".

A CBC Fifth Estate episode and accompanying CBC News article investigated how Canada had fallen into a "rental crisis", which could affect a third of the Canadian population.    One of the major factors considered was the financialization of the rental housing sector.  While Nethercote had investigated the financialization of rental housing in the private real estate market, CBC examined the issue from the point of view of renterssingle parents, large families, pensioners and others on fixed or low incomes, young people starting their careerswho felt that their voices were not being heard. In a Fifth Estate interview, Calgary, Alberta based Michael BrooksCEO of Real Property Association Of Canada (REALPAC) that lobbies the federal government on behalf of Canada's largest institutional landlords, said that the private sector was not "primarily in the business of providing a public good", such as affordable housing. The private sector is "self-interested in maintaining and growing their income". They "want to be seen as contributing to the solution and not being part of the problem." Their obligations are to their investors, which includes managing costs. REALPAC members, an association that was established in 1970, comprised $1 trillion in assets under management across Canada by 2022. Since 2019, Brooks has served on the Sustainable Development Advisory Council of the Canadian federal government and the United Nations Environment Program Finance Initiative, as a business advisor, and on the World Green Building Council (WGBC) since 2021. The Brookings Institute lists REITs, along with large Canadian banks, and multinational corporations as the "most reliable dividend payers" and recommends that pensioners invest in these financial instruments. During the pandemic REITs and other financial landlords "thrived" with individual REITs posting 100s of millions in profits in the first three months alone. They benefited from the historically low interest rates backed by the CMHC to buy and sell multi-family residential buildings, refinance debt, do renovations that allowed them to raise rents.

Affordable housing for First Nations, Inuit and Metis communities
Prior to the 1950s, Inuit lived semi-nomadic lives moving from hunting camps to fishing camps. In the 1950s, federal government agencies promised Inuit quality housing to convince them to move into permanent hamlets across what was then part of the Northwest Territories. During the Qikiqtani Truth Commission undertaken by the Qikiqtani Inuit Association, Inuit testified repeatedly that the promises of quality housing were not kept.  The government did not consult with Inuit in regards to "appropriate and affordable housing.  The first federal rent-to-own housing program began in 1959 as The Eskimo Housing Loan Program, which offered low-cost 16' x 16' Rigid Frame poorly-constructed buildings with no reflection of Inuit lifestyle, that were quickly called "matchbox" houses. The payment plan was for 7 to 10 years at $15 monthly. Even at this price these houses were unaffordable as most "Inuit subsisted on hunting and seasonal employment." With the collapse of the Loan Program in 1965, new complex rental systems administered
by housing councils were introduced. As of 2021, in Nunavut there were 5,600 public housing units with rents geared to income managed by the Nunavut Housing Corporation (NHC) with more than 20,000 tenants. This is one facet of the way in which Nunavut has been addressing housing issues. Nunavut's housing challenges are complex and are dealt with using "multi-faceted approaches." This includes "trauma-informed policies and programs" which are necessary to respond to "intergenerational trauma from forced relocation and residential schools." which impact "socio-economic conditions in Nunavut". In a 2021 podcast, Mumilaaq Qaqqaq, a former MP for Nunavut, described the three-week tour to Nunavut hamlets to report on the housing crisis first hand. She reported on multi-generational families living in over-crowded, drafty, mould-ridden houses that had not been repaired or renovated in years.

Following in-depth media reports critical on the lack of action on the part of the federal government, a comprehensive study of Indigenous housing in Canada was commissioned resulting in the 1992 report, A Time for Action: Aboriginal and Northern Housing. The report said that about 50% of 70,000 houses on reserve houses were "unfit" as residences and called for the "immediate construction of 21,700 new homes." The report said that 6,700 homes needed to be replaced, while about 44,500 houses "required substantial repairs." The cost at that time was estimated at $2.1 billion.

Following 18 months of talks on improving access to housing, employment, health services, and education, the Government of Canada, First Ministers of the Provinces, Territorial Leaders, and the leaders of five national Aboriginal organizations signed a series of agreements in 2005, known as the Kelowna Accord with a five-year $5-billion plan to "improve the lives of First Nations, Métis and Inuit." It would have included $1.6 billion for housing. In the first budget during the Premiership of Stephen Harperwho did not endorse the Accordthe 2006 budget allocating only $150 million to finance housing, education, clean water, and other services for First Nations, Métis and Inuit. Instead, the Harper government introduced a "market-based solution" to the housing crisis on reserves in 2008the First Nations Market Housing Fundto help individual First Nations households purchase homes on reserves with a goal of "25,000 privately owned dwellings by 2018". The federal government made a one-time investment of $300 million in 2008, and did not consult First Nations on the new concept of housing. Housing on reserves is considered to be a federal responsibility as a treaty right. From 2008 to 2015 the fund grew to $344 million through non-housing investments. Administrative costs, stipends and travel expenses total about $3.6 million a year and in eight years only 99 homes were built. Pierre Poilievre was the minister responsible for the CMHC at that time, the agency that managed the Fund.

Housing is just one of a number of social determinants of health (SDH), along with poverty, employment, income, education, social support networks, physical environments, early child development, gender and social capital, that prevent Indigenous peoples in Canada from achieving health equity with other Canadians. According to a 2015 meta-analysis by a team of University of Alberta and Memorial University researchers, sources in their systematic review indicated that Indigenous peoples in Alberta were more likely to have a "limited affordability for dwellings" and to "live in dwellings with inappropriate housing conditions and private spaces." As of 2016, First Nations, Inuit and Metis households lived in "inadequate and insufficient" housing; this was recognized as a critical problem across Canada.

Background

Twentieth-century
Following the Great Depression and World War II many Canadians lived in inadequate housing as fewer new homes were built, older homes needed repairs, and families lived in over-crowded dwellings. The 1935 Dominion Housing Act (DHA) established the focus of federal policies on housing programs as market- instead of social welfare-oriented for decades to come. For example, the DHA included no subsidized low rental housing; instead it introduced a joint government private lender mortgage loans for the 20% of Canadians who could afford to purchase real estate in the marketplace. During the post-WWII period federal housing policy included using taxation to revitalize the housing market, while also building social housing and subsidizing rental housing in the private sector. In 1946, the federal Wartime Housing Corporation was replaced with Central Mortgage and Housingnow known as Canada Mortgage and Housing Corporation (CMHC), a federal Crown Corporation. The CMHC administers the National Housing Act providing Canadians with grants, loans to purchase homes in the market system, and with mortgage insurance on credit financing through private lenders. In the late 1940s the federal government provided 75% of funding and subsidies, with the provinces adding 25%, towards public social and rental housing for low-income families. In the 1950s, municipalities received federal grants towards urban renewal projects which included low-rent housing developments, some of which included rent-geared-to-income (RGI) subsidies. With the introduction of the CMHC's Mortgage Loan Insurance, home ownership became more accessible. The federally-backed insurance allowed homebuyers and private mortgage providers to take a greater risk on mortgages that had a 25% down payment.

During the 1960s, Canada's economy grew at a sustained pace. In the mid-1960s, Prime Minister Lester Pearson said that in a democratic society the goal must be for everyone to have "decent housing." In the 1970s, public housing policy obligation was based on ensuring all Canadians were adequately housed. Through amendments to the National Housing Act in 1973, 20,000 social housing units were built every year.

From the 1950s to the 1970s the government built "dedicated affordable rental stock and public housing".

During the Premiership of Pierre Elliot Trudeau, then minister of urban affairs, Ron Basford, introduced the amended National Housing Act by saying, "“When we talk about people’s basic needsthe requirements for survivalsociety and the government obviously have an obligation to assure that these basic needs of shelter are met." Housing strategies focused on "rehousing people into better housing and neighbourhoods". Starting in the early 1970s, for almost two decades there were approximately 16,000 non-profit or co-op homes built or acquired every year. In the next ten years, the number of residential co-operatives dropped to about 1,500 homes a year. This began to change in the 1970s, as government role was reduced. In a 2018 Journal of the American Planning Association article, four researchers described how the changing role of government in Canada since the 1970s, affected affordable housing for those with lower incomes. Public policies since the 1970s favoured more market-based solutions, and as a result the government's role in providing social services was reduced, including in the provision of affordable housing for those with lower incomes. Public policies, such as "inclusionary zoning, density bonuses, and housing trusts" introduced at that time in some municipalities in the United States to reduce housing affordability pressures for lower income earners, were not adopted in Canada at the same rate. The authors said that in the absence of any adequate policies to balance housing needs of those whose ability to pay is constrained with the market's natural tendency to provide housing to those who can afford to pay, led the growth of developments in central locations where amenities are rich for homebuyers whose incomes were increasingly higher than lower income earners.

In his September 18, 2000 Toronto Star article, "The invention of homelessness", University of Toronto professor, whose research focusses on housing issues and homelessness, wrote that "homelessness"as a terms to describe a social problemwas rarely used before the 1980s. When the United Nations announced in 1981, that there would be an International Year of Shelter for the Homeless in 1987, their statement referred only to developing countries and made no mention of Canada or other countries with advanced economies. By 1987, academics and conferences focused on the unhoused in Canada and other the developed nations. According to Hulchanski, prior to the 1980s, "people in developed countries did not know what it was like to be unhoused". Housing was available for unmarried men in poor quality rooming houses, but they were not unhoused. 

In 1984, the federal government began cutting back on social housing. In the early 1980s, the concept of core housing need was developed in Canada as a basis for evaluating those eligible for federal funding under the 1986 Global Agreements on Social Housing, between the CMHC, the provinces, and territories regarding administration and cost sharing of social housing programs under the National Housing Act and the CMHC Act.

There was a consistent increase in housing affordability problems starting in the early 1980s in "all regions and major cities" and for almost all social classes of Canadian households, according to a 2004 article in the Housing Studies journal. Affordability problems were "highly concentrated" in low-income households, particularly in households led by women.

In the late 1980s, there was a major shift in housing policies which included amendments to taxation that benefitted those who could afford home ownership. At the same time, the federal government withdrew from funding projects for social and affordable housing resulting in a dramatic decline in affordable housing stock. There was a "massive investment" in building houses and condominiums and a dramatic decline in purpose-built rental apartment units. Investors purchased some condos for rental units but rents were priced at the "higher end of market" and were affordable only for households with higher incomes.

In the 1990s, although the price of houses remained "remarkably stable", income inequality increased and housing affordability problems became more prevalent and more severe. Throughout the 1990s, the federal government was focused on cutting the federal deficit, and began to transfer responsibility to supply social housing for those in needincluding low-income housingto the provinces and territories. The provinces and territories transferred some of these responsibilities to municipalities without providing corresponding financial resources.

Statistics Canada reported that while Canada's "real gross domestic product (GDP) per capita increased by roughly 50% between 1980 and 2005," and the workforce increased educational attainment and work experience during this same period and median earnings among the top 20% of full-time full-year employees grew by 17.9%", among those in the bottom one-fifth of the distribution median earnings decreased by 13.3%." Full-time full-year median earnings of Canadians edged only slightly higher from $41,348 in 1980 to $41,401 in 2005.

From the mid-1990s until at least 2010, the pace of growth in the Canadian economy was the strongest and most sustained since the 1960s. In 2012, while Canada had a strong real estate market many Canadian households faced housing insecurity.

By 1991, Canadian public policy on the affordability of housing was more aligned with the concept of need than in the United Kingdom in the 1980s, for example, where the concept of affordability was more market-oriented.

By 1996, the federal government revoked the Canada Assistance Plan of 1966, which made it mandatory that people whose income was inadequate to meet basic needs (including the working poor) have access to an established appeals procedures in the provinces and territories regarding social assistance. In the same year, the federal government transferred responsibility for most existing federal housing program to the provinces. During the 1990s, there was a devolution of new responsibilities, including affordable housing, from provincial governments to municipal governments without adequate revenue tools.

By the mid-1990s Canada had a recognized national homelessness crisis. Homelessness, which is at the most extreme end of the housing affordability continuum—affected a diverse population of individuals and families.

Between 1993 and 2003, while federal government revenues increased 12% and the provinces and territories increased 13%, municipalities' revenues only increased by 8%. From 1993 to 2004, federal and provincial fiscal transfers to municipalities decreased from 25 cents per dollar of municipal revenue to 16 cents, representing a decrease of 37% while their responsibilities had increased resulting in a fiscal imbalance. Since the early 1990s, the responsibility of providing support for affordable housing, and a number of other social issues related to the environment, First Nations, Inuit and Metis, public health and security, had been downloaded with no increase in sources of funding.

Twenty-first century
The Affordable Housing Initiative (AHI) operating from 2001 to 2011 was an intergovernmental multilateral housing initiative on affordable housing. The federal government, working through Canada Mortgage and Housing Corporation provided funding for the supply of new affordable rental housing under the Affordable Housing Program was CAD$1 billion from 2001 to 2008 (to be matched by provinces and territories). The federal government placed the AHI within the Affordable Housing Framework 2011–2014 to improve "access to affordable, sound, suitable and sustainable housing." The Framework acknowledged that a wide range of solutions was required to respond to the diversity of affordable housing program needs and priorities specific to each jurisdiction. Under the Framework it was reiterated that the responsibility for the design and delivery of affordable housing programs lay with the provinces and territories. The provinces and territories would be given flexibility in how to invest federal funds that were to be matched by provinces and territories, if the overall intended outcome was reached. The goal was "to reduce the number of Canadians in housing need by improving access to affordable housing that is sound, suitable and sustainable" Examples of initiatives that could be undertaken under the Framework included "new construction, renovation, homeownership assistance, rent supplements, shelter allowances, and accommodations for victims of family violence."

Since 2000 the cost of renting increased by more than 20%.

To support affordable housing in 2001, the CMHC introduced Canada Mortgage Bonds, with a focus on low-cost interest rates and mortgages.

 the CMHC directed those needing subsidized housing for low-income households to the municipal government. In 2011 the Canadian Federation of Municipalities called for better coordination between the three levels of government as the expanded responsibilities were either "unfunded or underfunded".

A 2003 TD Economic report recommended that government initiatives should focus on raising market incomes at the lower end, as the number of low-income households was too high. The report raised concerns about low-income households that were subject to provincial and federal claw backs and tax backs, for example, on back to work and the federal-provincial National Child Benefit (NCB). The report said that decreasing the number of low income household would be more effective than the inefficient, expensive, publicly funded expenditure-based or tax-based incentives to increase the number of affordable rental units.

Lack of affordable housing is one of the complex set of factors that lead to homelessness. All levels of government in Canada began to include housing policies and strategies that responded to the crisis although anti-poverty strategies and programs to end  homelessness. Activists said that the efforts were insufficient, inefficient, or unsustainable.

The TD report concluded that municipalities need a more sustainable funding arrangement, and provinces need to play a more active role in affordable housing, becoming leaders within the Affordable Housing Framework agreement.

By 2004, 1.7 million Canadians experienced housing affordability issues. From 2009 through 2104, the federal government budgeted $388 million a year for the housing sector.

The number of rental units declined starting in 2005. By 2007, affordability of housing was a problem for low and middle income Canadians. Canadians in the lowest quintile who were in renters households were 18 times more likely than the average household to experience affordability problems.

The 2006 Canadian federal budget "provided $300 million for affordable housing in the territories."

With historically low interest rates, and readily available debt and mortgage financing in 2007, Canada's housing market was in a period of strong growth. Affordable housing was a relative measure. At the same time private affordable rental stock across Canada was low. In many cities the vacancy rate for affordable rental units was less than 1%.

In the 21st century, the gap between incomes of the upper quintile and lower quintile reached unprecedented extremes according to reports in 2006 and 2010. Households in the upper quintile—particularly in large affluent urban areas—could afford to purchase houses for investment and/or residency at higher prices by taking advantage of the low interest rates. Between 1997 and 2007, 1% or 246,000 Canadians earned average incomes of $405,000 representing 32% of all growth in incomes. There were 24.6 million tax filers in Canada in 2007. The richest 1% made more than $169,000 and had an average income of $404,000. The richest 0.1% made more than $621,000 and had an average income of $1.49 million. The richest 0.01% made more than $1.85 million and had an average income of $3.83 million.

Income levels in the upper quintile have increased exponentially while those in lower quintiles have remained stagnant.  housing prices and construction costs rose dramatically in Canada as they did elsewhere in the world.

The 2009 Canadian federal budget allocated funds for the period covering (2009–2011): renovation and energy retrofits to social housing ($1 billion); to build housing for low-income seniors ($400 million); to build social housing for persons with disabilities ($75 million); to support social housing in the North ($200 million); low-cost loans to municipalities to improve housing-related infrastructure ($2 billion) as part of Canada's Economic Action Plan.

There was a modest improvement in housing affordability across Canada in the third quarter of 2011 after two consecutive quarters of deterioration. Part of this was due to decreased costs in home ownership resulting from lower mortgage rates.

By 2012, the rising inequality gap had presented a significant challenge for Canadian households who were "priced out" of rental and ownership housing markets. By 2012, there was a slight deterioration in housing affordability, according to the Royal Bank of Canada (RBC).

 many parts of the country also reported that key workers—teachers, nurses, police officers, construction workers and others – who earned reasonably good income from their professions, were finding it increasingly difficult to afford the high cost of housing." According to a Federation of Canadian Municipalities 2012 report, one third of Canadians were renters. The construction and rehabilitation of affordable rental units did not kept pace with the number of affordable rental units lost to demolition, urban intensification projects and the more profitable conversion to condominiums. Fewer than 10% of new housing starts by 2012 were rental units. The FCA found that the shortage of available rental housing is worsening at the same time that more Canadians are being priced out of home ownership.

In the 2014 report, State of Homelessness in Canada, by the Canadian Alliance to End Homelessness and York University, a lead author of the report, Stephen Gaetz, called for direct federal funding for building affordable housing units to respond to homelessness in Canada as the fall budget showed a surplus. Gaetz said that if an extra $46 per Canadian was spent on affordable housing it would hasten the end of chronic homelessness and help many thousands of Canadians who were at risk of homelessness. The report estimated that the cost to the economy of the 235,000 Canadians estimated to experienced homelessness annually was about $7 billion. The numbers of homeless has not decreased despite "$2 billion earmarked in federal funding." Over the last quarter of a century the federal government has been decreasing investment in affordable housing. By 2014, this represents a decrease of 46% since the 1980s. Since 1989, the population of Canada increased 30% but the amount per capita spent to build affordable housing stock decreased from $115 per capita in 1989 to $60 per capita in 2014. In 1982, the federal government built 20,450 affordable housing units; in 2006 only 4,393 units were built. Gaetz called attention to public policies in places such as taxation that benefitted homeowners by approximately $8.6 billion a year. The report said that the federal government was funneling money to those who are not in need while neglecting those in the greatest need.

Measuring affordability of housing
In a 1994 background paper commissioned by the Ontario Human Rights Commission, Hulchanski, who is the North American editor of the international journal Housing Studies, described how the ratio of housing cost as a percentage of income was 12% from 1900 to the early 1920s, when it was increased to 20%. This changed again in the 1960s to 25%. It was changed to 30% in the mid-1980s. Determining housing affordability is complex and the commonly used housing-expenditure-to-income-ratio tool has been challenged. Canada, for example, switched to a 25% rule from a 20% rule in the 1950s. In the 1980s, this was replaced by a 30% rule of thumb. When the monthly carrying costs of a home exceed 30–35% of household income, then the housing is considered unaffordable for that household. While the 30% rule continues to be used by the CMHC, banks, and mortgage providers, it has been challenged by Hulchanski and others.

A commonly accepted guideline for housing affordability is shelter-cost-to-income ratio (STIR), in which a cost that does not exceed 30% of a household's gross income is considered to be affordable. Unresolved issues remain about the elements of affordable housing. Affordability of housing may have differing definitions to governments, mortgage providers, developers, urban planners, economists and individual householders seeking a residence. Income levels in relation to housing prices are the most frequently used variables in deciding housing affordability but other factors such as employment trends, access to (and the cost of) finance, demographic shifts, housing preferences and other housing costs besides the price of purchase impact on housing affordability. One question is what should be included in 'housing' costs. Such expenses could include taxes, insurance, utility costs, maintenance and/or furnishings and rent for owners and/or tenants. Another question is what is meant by 'income'. Does this include gross or net income; one or all adults' income; and children's income, if any. It is also unclear how sharp temporary fluctuations in income and non-cash sources of goods and services get factored into the calculation. The shelter-cost-to-income ratio (STIR) is well above 30% for the median income. Nationally, it is 48.7% for two-story homes. Major cities such as Vancouver rate worst in the world at 88.9%. Calgary is considered affordable at 36.7%. Montreal is 41.8% and Toronto is 53.4%. The RBC Indicator provides data on a quarterly basis on home ownership affordability, it measures the proportion of homes currently for sale that are affordable to a median income household. Measurements of affordability that are oriented exclusively to the ability to buy using mainly shelter-cost-to-income ratio (STIR) provide useful information for one end of the continuum of housing in Canada, home ownership in the private market at market price.

The CMHC recognizes the limitations of STIR for understanding affordability. In a very low income household for example, even 15% of a household's before-tax income for housing may be unaffordable.

Governments, financial institutions (banks, mortgage providers), housing sectors (real estate agencies), consumers, and advocacy organizations use different definitions of affordability.

The Canadian census provides data on core housing need in municipalities, provinces and territories, including the percentage of Canadian households that live in core housing need. Statistics Canada provides updates on housing related data such as the Canadian Housing Statistics Program (CHSP) which is reported by The Daily. The Bank of Canada's Housing Affordability Index (HAI), the Royal Bank of Canada Housing Affordability Measure, and the National Bank of Canada's Housing Affordability Monitor are examples of the ways affordability is measured in order to qualify for a mortgage in Canada.

Measuring affordability of housing is complicated by Canada's vast physical and human geography which includes remote northern communities and affluent urban regions.

A 2011 article said that affordability of housing public policy analysts should also monitor other indicators that are more appropriate for the contemporary Canadian context such as, what proportion of rental units are affordable to a median income rental household, a comparison of wage requirement needed to rent unit, the demand for housing assistance, the number of households in core need as a milestone measure, the number of people using emergency homeless shelters, number of people filing notice of eviction, arrears or foreclosures, rental vacancy rates at market prices, rental vacancy units at modest-low income stock and the number of MLS sales affordable to marginal buyers.

The City of Calgary refers to affordable housing in terms of need; a household is in need of affordable housing when it earns less than $60,000/year and spends over 30% of gross income on the cost of housing.

Londerville also notes that the maximum Total Debt Service ratio (the "ratio of the borrower's total debt payments, including mortgage payments and property taxes, to their gross household income") is underused in evaluating affordability. "There is an argument that the calculation should be based on take home pay rather than gross pay. It could be different for different income levels – 40% of $40,000 does not leave a lot of room for other household expenses. Young homeowners who have children in daycare can be paying a fee almost equivalent to a second mortgage payment; this is not taken into account when calculating the maximum the bank will lend because it is not defined as a debt."

Eighty per cent of Canadians are served by market-based housing, which includes individual home ownership and private rental housing. In the market-based housing system, individuals finance their own housing, independent of government assistance.

A 2019 Royal Bank of Canada RBC Economics report on home affordability said that, in nine of the 14 market areas they track, a majority of Canadian families are able to purchase an average home. The most affordable markets are Saint John, St. John's, Regina, Quebec City and Halifax, while the least affordable markets are Vancouver, Toronto, and Victoria.

The Bank of Canada's 2011 "affordability index represents the proportion of the average personal disposable income per worker that goes toward mortgage payments, based on current house prices and mortgage rates. A decline in the ratio indicates an improvement in affordability." Mark Carney—the Governor of the Bank of Canada warned in 2011, that even though measures of housing affordability in Canada were favorable in most cases—with some housing markets already severely unaffordable even at current rate—interest rates were at a record low. He raised concerns that Canadian household debt was high and therefore vulnerable to increases in mortgage interest rates which could cause housing affordability fall to "its worst level in 16 years."

Mortgage lending institutions define affordability in terms of potential home buyers consider the relative cost of debt based on interest rates and average household incomes. This measure of affordability is not oriented towards renters.

In its  2016 second quarter report Canada Mortgage and Housing Corporation  warned housing prices are overvalued in 9 Canadian markets, with Vancouver at high risk.
Strong evidence of "problematic conditions" also continue to exist in Toronto, Calgary, Saskatoon and Regina, while in Ottawa "problematic conditions" are weak.

Accurate measurement of housing affordability is needed to decide if a family qualifies for assistance in housing or for a mortgage to purchase privately. While the 30% rule may be used for the latter, banks and lending agencies might require a much higher Qualifying Income before approving a mortgage. The Royal Bank of Canada Housing Affordability Measure describes a qualifying income as "the minimum annual income used by lenders to measure the ability of a borrower to make mortgage payments. Typically, no more than 32% of a borrower's gross annual income should go to 'mortgage expenses'—principal, interest, property taxes and heating costs." The Bank of Canada maintains the Housing Affordability Index (HAI) based on housing costs, which include mortgage payments and utilities, in relation to disposable income of an average family. Housing costs do not include property taxes. The HAI represents the percentage of disposable income the average Canadian household would need to cover the mortgage and utilities of their home.

By Q3 2021, 37.1% of disposable income was needed to pay for housing costs, which represents an increase of 5.2 points in 2021, the highest ratio since 2008. In 2008, the average home prices were much lower than in 2021 and the interest rates were 5 points higher than the Bank of Canada's 2021 rate, which is near zero.

Home ownership in Canada

In 1981 the rate of home ownership in Canada was 62.4%, after dropping to an all-time low of 60% in 1999, it increased to 63.9% in 2000; to 68.4% in 2006, and  68.55% in 2021.

Since the 1990s there was a rapid increase in the price of residential real estate since the 1990s, so the increase in home ownership, also resulted in an increase in mortgage debt. According to a 2012 Bank of Canada (BOC) report,  the BOC's affordability measure (AFF), which was based on the "ratio of monthly mortgage payments to disposable income (DI)", was "consistently favourable by historical standards" starting in the late 1990s. According to Mark Carney—the Governor of the Bank of Canada  from 2008 to 2013—the demand for housing in Canada was consistent with housing supply. Carney warned in 2011, that even though measures of housing affordability in Canada were favorable in most cases—with some housing markets already severely unaffordable even at current rate—interest rates were at a record low. He raised concerns that Canadian household debt was high and therefore vulnerable to increases in mortgage interest rates which could cause housing affordability fall to "its worst level in 16 years."Affordability in the real estate market was increased partly because of labour market conditions that supported increased income and the low interest rates. The banking sector benefitted from the "strong credit growth" and higher loads of indebtedness that these homebuyers incurred from 2001 to 2011. However, concerns were raised about the very high household indebtedness which had reached c. 150% of debt-to-income ratio by 2012.

As of early 2020, about a third of all homes in Ontario and British Columbia were owned by investors also known as multiple-residential property owners. In Nova Scotia and New Brunswick investors own 40% of all residential housing units. Concerns have been raised that while the investors group provide a significant portion of rental housing supply but may also be responsible for the rapid escalation of residential properties. Scrutiny of this buyers group increased during the COVID-19 pandemic as the housing supplies reached crucial lows. The CHSP April 2022 data revealed that in urban areas, the median income of renters was $25,000 compared to FTHBs whose median income was twice as much, $50,000, in larger census metropolitan areas (CMAs) across Canada.

About one third of Canadians rent their homes. Ontario and British Columbia have a higher rate of residential property rentals.

During the COVID-19 pandemic, housing suppliesparticularly affordable housingdropped to historical lows. The average price of a home in Canada increased 17.1% to $779,000 in Q4 2021 compared to Q4 2020, according to a Royal LePage survey.

A 13 January 2022 Bank of Canada report examined three types of buyers in Canada,  first-time home buyers (FTHBs), repeat homebuyers, and investors or multiple residential property owners. The CHSP April 2022 data revealed that in urban areas, the median income of renters was $25,000 compared to FTHBs whose median income was twice as much, $50,000, in larger census metropolitan areas (CMAs) across Canada. Nineteen per cent of the down payment towards purchase of the first home was gifted by a family member. Residential property owners are described as "repeat buyers" when they buy a new home while selling their old one; multiple residential property owners are described as "investors" if they purchase a new residence, potentially for rental income, while keeping their old one. Investors or multiple residential property owners, who may be individuals or entities, own properties as an investment including rental income, as a recreational property which may be as a source of rental income. The report describes investors as older, higher-income, and more indebted. According to the Bank of Canada report based on mortgage data, since 2014, FTHBs have been the largest group of homebuyers in Canada, representing about 50% of all mortgaged home purchases; repeat homebuyers represented 31%, and investors represented 19% since 2014. During the pandemic, FTHBs represented 47% in June 2021, compared to 53% in 2015. The Bank of Canada reported a "rapid increase" in mortgage home purchases by all three groups, but the most pronounced increase was in the investors group.

According to Statistics Canada's Canadian Housing Statistics Program (CHSP) data for 2019 and 2020 on home ownership reported on 12 April 2022, which compared first-time home buyers (FTHBs) and multiple residential property owners, the latter own about a third of all residential properties in Canada. Of these the top 10% wealthiest represent 25% of residential housing value. While investors provide a significant part of the rental housing supply, they may also exacerbate the "so-called boom-bust cycles in housing markets" causing economic instability.

Affordability problem

In Canada's market based housing system, in 2010 the federal government intervened only when affordability of housing was stressed to the point home ownership became inaccessible even to individuals with full-time employment.

The United Nations Committee on Economic, Social and Cultural Rights issued a highly critical and detailed report on Canada's social policies in its 1998 review of Canada's compliance with these rights particularly about disastrous levels of homelessness. It concluded "that while Canada has a long history of housing successes, the housing cuts starting in the late 1980s have effectively prevented Canada from meeting its international housing obligations." Similar concerns were raised in their 2016 follow up report, which called for respect for the right to adequate housing. The Committee raised concerns about the housing crisis and the lack of a national housing strategy and funding, inadequate housing subsidies, the shortage of housing supply, and evictions and called for action on a number of issues. This included increase resources for housing at the federal and provincial levels, incease the supply of social and affordable units "substantially"; protect renters from evictions specifically in accordance with international laws regarding homelessness. The committee recommended that the federal government adopt a national strategy on homelessness.

Until 2012, Canadian policymakers and researchers did not have a common understanding of homelessness or a working definition. The Canadian Observatory on Homelessness (COH)then called the Canadian Homelessness Research Network (CHRN)a Canadian non-profit, non-partisan research institute  that measures homelessness in Canada in order to better address homelessness, developed a definition of homelessness which categorizes people who are homeless as "unsheltered", "emergency sheltered", "provisionally accommodated" and "at risk of homelessness." The European Typology of Homelessness and Housing Exclusion (ETHOS) definition also uses similar categories. Lacking a consistent definition, Canadian public policy had focussed only on "absolute homelessness".

The mayors of Canada's largest cities, declared the lack of affordable housing a national housing disaster in 1998. The federal government responded by announcing cost-shared conditional federal-provincial initiatives to construct affordable housing, worth $1 billion. However, during this period of tax cutting and debt reduction initiatives, the devolution of federal responsibilities to the provinces, without an accompanying transfer of funds, made it impossible for the provinces to contribute their share for affordable housing projects. Provinces were focused on reducing government size and increasing provincial tax cuts.

All mortgages provided by federally regulated institutions where the down payment is 25% or less, are required under the federal Bank Act, to carry mortgage insurance, according to a 2005 Canadian Business journal article. In 2004, this represented 45% of all home buyers, or 500,000 Canadian households at a total cost of $1.6 billion for mortgage insurance which was paid to the CMHC, the Crown corporation that provides mortgage insurance. Based on the CMHC's 2004 annual report, mortgage insurance premiums collected totaled $1.1 billion while $51 million in claims were paid out, which represents less than 5% payout. From 1994 through 2004, CMHC paid out at approximately 45% which is much lower than most other kinds of insurance. The 2005 Canadian Business article cautioned that the CMHC's mortgage insurance program was the most "lucrative line of insurance in Canada." CMHC's government-backed mortgage insurance purchased at a flat, upfront fee for mortgage insurance through Canada Mortgage and Housing Corporation is obligatory for home buyers with down of less than 20% of the home's value."

There are concerns about aggressive marketing that began in the mid-1990s making secured personal lines of credit (PLCs) (often secured by housing assets) much more widely available. By 2011 secured PLCs represented 50% of consumer debt. This places many households in a vulnerable exposed situation if housing prices drop, mortgage rates rise, or their income decreases.

Concerns over high Canadian household debt levels led to changes to mortgage regulations announced June 2012 by Finance Minister Jim Flaherty. The federal government lowered the maximum amortization period for a government-insured mortgage from 30 to 25 years. The upper limit Canadian homeowners could borrow against their home equity was lowered from 85% to 80%.

in 2012, Londerville of the Macdonald-Laurier Institute called for 40-year amortizations in "certain markets and for certain age groups, perhaps with limits on the house price" for example in the case of young households in the high-priced Toronto real estate market who "may need a 40-year amortization period on their first home to make it affordable."

The CMHC turns a large profit from this mortgage insurance collected mainly from first time buyers and those unable because of lower incomes to pay more than 20% down payment. Between 2001 and 2010 this mortgage insurance amounted to a $14 billion contribution towards reducing the Canadian federal debt. Londerville of the Macdonald-Laurier Institute notes IMF concerns about some CMHC practices and the unnecessary burden placed on home owners at the lower end of income scale. This erodes affordability.

In 2006, Canada Mortgage and Housing Corporation (CMHC) deemed that 20% of Canadian households (1.7 million households) fall within the core housing need. These households could not find adequate and suitable housing without spending 30% or more of their pre-tax income. CMHC found that a disturbing 656,000 households (7%) spent at least half of their before-tax income on shelter in 1996, up from 422,000 households, or 5%, in 1991. While accounting for only 35% of all households, almost 70% of those in core need were renters.

in 2006 5.5% of Canadians, 1.7 million people of a total population of 31 million were under-housed or non-housed.(Canadian Housing and Renewal Association).

The federal government's CMHC stated in 2021 that $2,225 per month constitutes "affordable" housing in Greater Montreal. This led to condemnation from both New Democratic Party and Conservative MPs. CMHC said that its principal goal was to stimulate new housing construction, not keep prices low.

A Conference Board of Canada 2010 report entitled "Building From the Ground Up: Enhancing Affordable Housing in Canada" argued that the shortage of affordable housing was "having a detrimental effect on Canadians' health, which, in turn, reduces their productivity, limits our national competitiveness, and indirectly drives up the cost of health care and welfare." Stress, asthma, and
diabetes are connected to inadequate housing.

Core housing need
In 1986, CMHC entered into Global and Operating Agreements under the National Housing Act and the CMHC Act, with the provinces and territories regarding administration and cost sharing of social housing programs. The core housing need concept was developed and adopted as an eligibility criterion to target households who were in need and as a basis to allocate federal funds through CMHC to participating provinces and territories. A household is considered to be in core housing need by CMHC if it meets certain criteriaif it falls below acceptable standards of affordability, adequacy, or suitability and if the cost of housing exceeds 30% or more of its before-tax household income.

Households are considered to have a housing affordability problem by CMHC if they have to spend 30% or more of total before-tax household income on shelter expenses. Shelter expenses include "rent and any payments for electricity, fuel, water and other municipal services" for renters and "mortgage payments (principal and interest), property taxes, and any condominium fees, along with payments for electricity, fuel, water and other municipal services" for home owners.

Data on core housing need is collected by Statistics Canada through the Canadian Housing Survey.

In 2006, about 5.1% of Canadian households were considered to be in severe housing need, spending 50% or more on shelter.

In 2011, about 1.5 million Canadian households or 12.5% of Canadian households were in core housing need, and various levels of governance in Canada were exploring policy solutions to assist challenges faced by the low-income renter and homeowner overburdened with shelter costs.

In 2016, about 1.7 million Canadian households or 12.7% of Canadian households were in core housing need. The percentage was slightly higher in urban areas, with about 13.6% of all Canadian households living in urban areas—1.6 million urban households—were in core housing need. In 2016, the regions with the highest percentage of households in core housing need, were Nunavut with 36.5%, Northwest Territories at 15.5%, Ontario at 15.3%, and Yukon at 15.2%. In 2016, the highest rates of core housing need in metropolitan areas included Toronto at 19.1%, Vancouver at 17.6%, Belleville at 15.4%, and Peterborough at 15.1%.

The 2020 report on the 2018 Survey revealed that 1,644,900 Canadian households or 11.6% were in core housing need. Only 6.5% of homeowners experienced core housing needs compared to renter households, where 23% were likely to live in core housing need. Twenty one per cent of renters did not live in core housing need.

Core housing need does not measure progress against some measurable indicator.

Public policy (20162022)

National Housing Strategy

Canada's National Housing Strategy says that affordable housing is a cornerstone of "sustainable, inclusive communities." In November 2017, the federal government announced the National Housing Strategy with funding of $40 billion over 10 years to build 100,000 new affordable units, repair 300,000 affordable units and to cut homelessness by 50% . The National Housing Strategy marks a significant shift in housing policy for the federal government.

Until 2017, Canada was the only major country in the world, and the only G8 nation, that lacked a National Housing Strategy.

Prior to 2017, housing initiatives were introduced and funded by the federal, provincial, territorial and municipal governments, along with civil society organizations (including the charitable sector). In 2016, the Canadian federal minister of families, children and social development  said that strategies for a  national affordable-housing strategy were being considered .

The CMHC will administer seed funding, co-investment fund, the innovation fund, the federal lands initiative, rental construction financing. It will expand the mortgage loan insurance to include market properties and flexibilities for affordable housing.

Canadian Housing and Renewal Association
During the premiership of Justin Trudeau, the federal program called the National Housing Co-investment Fund (NHCF) was introduced offering low-cost CMHC loans for developers who are building affordable housing projects. Funds for affordable housing was increased in the spring federal budget and in the fall of 2021. This included an additional $2.7 billion for the NHCF. The NHCF budget allocated $250 million to target housing for domestic violence survivors. In November 2021, Jeff Morrison, head of the national non-profit association advocacy group, the Canadian Housing and Renewal Association, said that while more federal funding for community housing is the right step, the CMHC loan approval process is too slow.

Affordability by province

Alberta
According to the City of Calgary, as of 2016, the majority of households in Calgary, 78%, were able to meet their housing needs in the marketplace. A small percentage of the households who have inadequate income to acquire housing the market, 3%, are supported by the government. This leaves about 19% of households who are in need of affordable housing, as defined by the city.

Approximately 21% of Alberta's population spends more than 30% of their income on housing.

According to the 2016 census, Fort McMurray, which is the urban centre of the municipality of Wood Buffalo, Alberta with a population of 66,000, which is dominated by the oil sands industry, had the highest median household income in Canada of $193,511 before tax in 2015.  Seven of the ten highest-income Canadian cities in 2015 were in Alberta. Fort McMurray's median income was 106% higher than Alberta's median income of $103,720, which in turn was higher than Canada's median annual household income of $90, 390. In spite of the high cost of housing and living in FMWB, only 12% of FMWB households spent over 30% of their income on housing in 2015.

As of 2022, there were 84,000 households in Calgary that had an annual income of less than $60,000 and spent more than 30% on housing, representing about 20% of Calgary's households. This meets the definition of a household in need of affordable housing. Seventy-five per cent of Calgary households did not have sufficient income to purchase a single-family home. Calgary had the highest market rental rates in Canada. In order to rent a two-bedroom apartment a household would need to have an income of $53,000. Approximately 42,000 households were spending over 50% of the annual income on housing, putting them at risk of homelessness. Over 3,200 people in Calgary were homeless in 2022. Most urban centres in Canada have more non-market housing than Calgary, where only 3.6% of all housing in Calgary is non-market. The Calgary Housing Company manages Calgary-owned affordable housing units, which in 2022 consisted of more than over 10,000 units with over 25,000 tenants. This includes near market housing where rents are lower than market rates and subsidized housing such as rent supplements for tenants that rent from private landlords.

In 2011, the president of the Calgary Region's Canadian Home Builders' Association, Carol Oxtoby, explained the increase in luxury homes construction and sales in Calgary.  with its oil and gas and high-tech industries, young entrepreneurs and head offices, Calgary has some of the highest income earners and highest personal wealth in Canada per capita. In 2011 "448 homes in Calgary were resold for more than $1 million."

A 2010 study by M. Lio on "The Impact of Higher Energy Efficiency Standards on Housing Affordability in Alberta" funded by NAIMA Canada and the Consumers Council of Canada investigated the impact of total selling price of the house, cost of land, cost of labour, and the cost of materials on housing affordability for the cities of Calgary and Edmonton in 2010. The results showed that the rising cost of labour and materials were attributable to the total selling price of the house, but that the rate of increase in these two attributes was outweighed by the significant rise in land value. The trend in the cost of land for both cities by 2010 showed a strong impact on the new housing price index. The study concluded that - compared to the cost of labour and materials, the main reason for the increase in house prices was primarily due to land costs.

Since at least 2010, Calgary has had the "highest median after-tax income of all the major CMAs in Canada.  Calgary also has the "highest concentration of millionaires" and the "highest proportion of individuals with after-tax income of $100,000. Because RBC Economics and other mortgage and loan providers, measures affordability based on the percentage of medium income that a household requires to pay for ownership costs, housing in Calgary is considered to be the most affordable in Canada.

According to a 2017 report by economist Ron Kneebone, based an analysis of the cost of rent and the rates of social assistance over a ten-year period, Calgary is the "least-affordable city in Canada...if you're poor."

Ontario
The non-profit Housing Services Corporation delivers programs for the affordable housing sector in Ontario. It was created under the Housing Services Act, 2011 to replace the Social Housing Services Corporation (SHSC) which was operational from 2002 until 2012.

The SHSC was created in 2002 following the devolution of responsibility for over 270,000 social housing units from the province to the municipalities to "provide Ontario housing providers and service managers with bulk purchasing, insurance, investment and information services that add significant value to their operations."

Over 20% of home owners residing in Ontario had housing affordability issues as of 2006. A 2010 survey by the Ontario Non-Profit Housing Association revealed that the number of households on affordable housing waiting lists was at an "all-time high of 141,635".

Through partnerships with the government, private investors became interested again in investing in multi-family rental housing in the 1990s. CAPREIT was established in 1997 becoming Canada's first REIT. As more REITs were created, more multi-family rental housing were owned by these institutions. By 2015, CAPREIT was Toronto's biggest landlord with about 11, 000 rental units. In the fifteen years between 2000 and 2015, the ownership of Toronto apartments was increasingly concentrated among REITs, institutional investors, private equity funds and some large family-owned firms.

On 29 January 2020, a motion to declare a housing and homeless emergency in Ottawa was passed unanimously by Ottawa City Council, becoming the first Canadian city to declare such an emergency. Faced with an urgent need for more affordable housing, new housing subsidies, and more assistance to those who are chronically homeless, to people who need supportive housing for a number of reasonsincluding those with disabilities or serious injuriesthe city called on all levels of government to respond. The municipality provides 56% of funding for programs related to housing and homelessness, and the federal and provincial governments provide the remainder.

As of 2018, research shows that there is a "disconnect between evidence and public policy" in terms of urban planning based on promoting increased density and mixed-use zoning in cities like Toronto. An unintended negative consequence of these "quintessential tenets of good urban design, has been a decrease in affordable housing. A 2018 Journal of the American Planning Association article showed that in mixed-use zones, high-income earners in sectors such as "management, business, technology, and health" experienced greater housing affordabilitythey spent a smaller percentage of their income on housing even with higher priced housing because their incomes had increased. Housing affordability worsened for those with occupations in manufacturing, trades and cultural and social services. Their incomes had either remained stagnant or decreased over time and/or housing costs had increased. While this study focused on Toronto, the findings would be similar in other major census metropolitan areas (CMAs) like Vancouver.

The price of the average home in most cities and towns in Canada increased by double digits. In Toronto, the increase was 15% breaching the "$1 million mark for the first time" in February 2021.

According to Reuters, by October 2022, the shortage of construction workers in Canada was a major factor in responding to housing shortage challenges, particularly in Ontario, British Columbia and Quebec. According to a June 2022 CMHC report, the labour shortage could contribute to making housing less affordable. The CMHC report said that in order to make housing affordable in Canada by 2030, millions of new homes had to be built. 

The "More Homes Built Faster Act", which was introduced in November 2022 in response to Ontario's housing supply problems, raised concerns as it would make sweeping changes to a number of statutes.

British Columbia

Vancouver had the least affordable housing market in Canada by 1980; the average home cost 5.7 times the average family income. O' Toole calculated that given the high interest rates in 1980, "an average family would have to devote more than 70 percent of its income to pay off a mortgage on an average home in 30 years." According to a report in The Economist, a factor contributing to Vancouver's high property prices may be Canadian laws which enable foreigners to buy Canadian property—possibly for purposes of tax evasion or money laundering—while shielding their identities from tax authorities, a practice which is known as snow washing.

The governor of the Bank of Canada noted that affordability of housing has been eroded as wealthy Asian investors seeking diversification and hard assets purchase housing in Vancouver. Consequently, "[t]he average selling price of a home in Vancouver is now nearly 11 times the average Vancouver family's household income, a multiple similar to those seen in Hong Kong and Sydney—cities that have also become part of a more globalized real estate market."

There has been a move toward the integration of affordable social housing with market housing and other uses, such as the 2006–2010 redevelopment of the Woodward's building site in Vancouver. Woodward, a heritage site, was re-invented and has reinvigorated Gastown in Downtown Eastside, one of Vancouver's oldest and "most challenged" yet "resilient" communities.

The project has also been said to contribute to Vancouver being an inclusive city.

Randal O'Toole of the Fraser Institute in his report entitled "Unliveable Strategies: The Greater Vancouver Regional District and the Liveable Region Strategic Plan" (2011) argued that the GVRD urban planners focused too much on housing affordability as a lack of affordable housing for low-income families who would need some form of housing subsidy. He noted that GVRD reports failed to mention that there was also a lack of affordable housing for people with middle incomes. O'Toole said that the GVRD's land use planners "left the region with the least affordable housing and some of the worst traffic congestion in Canada". He concluded that Greater Vancouver Regional District planners' "Livable Region Strategic Plan" (1996) were too narrow in their focus on "avoiding urban sprawl and minimizing automobile driving." He also argued that the protection of green spaces, farm lands, from development limited growth and was the cause of the escalation of prices.

 Vancouver was the most stressed area in the province in terms of affordability of housing in Canada. In 2012, Vancouver was ranked by Demographia as the second-most unaffordable in the world, rated as even more severely unaffordable in 2012 than in 2011. The city has adopted various strategies to reduce housing costs, including cooperative housing, legalized secondary suites, increased density and smart growth. As of April 2010, the average two-level home in Vancouver sold for a record high of $987,500, compared with the Canadian average of $365,141.

In June 2016, Generation Squeeze, a non-profit organization that advocates on behalf of young adults, labeled the situation in the province a crisis and commenced a "Code Red" campaign.

In 2016, the BC government announced a $516 million dollar investment in 68 new affordable housing projects to build 2,900 units across the province, targeting renters with incomes that were low to moderate. This included 68 projects with 1441 units in Lower mainland and Fraser Valley, 774 units on Vancouver Island and the Gulf Islands, 256 units in Thompson-Okanagan, and the rest to Coast, Kootenays, Cariboo, and North/Northeast.

Nunavut
The capital of Nunavut faces an extreme affordability challenge mainly due to the supply side. In 2010 Iqaluit had the most expensive rental market in Canada: a two-bedroom apartment cost $2,365 a month in Iqaluit compared to $1,195 in Vancouver. In 2018, over 10,000 Nunavut residents were without housing of their own, translating to a deficit of 3,500 housing units.

See also
 Bill 28 (British Columbia)
 Snow washing
 Beneficial ownership
 Affordability of housing in the United Kingdom
 Affordable housing by country

Notes

Citations

References

A
  
 
 
B
 
  
 
 

 
 
 
 
 

C
 
 
 
 
 
  
 
 
 
 
 
 
  
  
 
 
 
 
 
 
 
 
 
 
 
 
 
 
 
 

D
 
 

 
 

E
 
 
 

F
 
 
 

G
 
 
 
 
 
 

H
  
 
 
 
 
 
 
 
 
 
 
 
 
 

I
 

J 
 

K
  

 
 

L
 
 
 
 
 
 
 

M
 
 
 
 
 
 

 

N
 
 
 
 

O
 
 
 

P
 
 
 
 
 
 

Q
 
 

R
 
 
 
 
 
 
 

S
 
 
 
 

 
 
 
 
 
 
 
 
 
  
 
 
 
 
 
 

T
 
 

U
 

V

 

W

 
 

Y

 
 

 

Canada
Housing in Canada